This article is about the particular significance of the year 1706 to Wales and its people.

Incumbents
Lord Lieutenant of North Wales (Lord Lieutenant of Anglesey, Caernarvonshire, Denbighshire, Flintshire, Merionethshire, Montgomeryshire) – Hugh Cholmondeley, 1st Earl of Cholmondeley
Lord Lieutenant of South Wales (Lord Lieutenant of Glamorgan, Brecknockshire, Cardiganshire, Carmarthenshire, Monmouthshire, Pembrokeshire, Radnorshire) – Thomas Herbert, 8th Earl of Pembroke

Bishop of Bangor –  John Evans
Bishop of Llandaff – William Beaw (until 10 February); John Tyler (from 30 June)
Bishop of St Asaph – William Beveridge
Bishop of St Davids – George Bull

Events
18 January - Erasmus Saunders is made Rector of Helmdon, Northamptonshire.
17 November - Thomas Mansel, future Baron Mansel, becomes 5th Baronet Mansel of Margam on the death of his father Edward Mansel.
date unknown  
Crickhowell Bridge rebuilt in stone.
At Esgair Hir mines, Cardiganshire, "The Governour and Company of the Mine-Adventurers of England [the company owned by Humphrey Mackworth] allow £20 per annum for a Charity-School for the Children of the miners and workmen belonging to the said Company. The said Company also give £30 yearly to a Minister to read prayers, preach, and catechise the children."
Ellis Pugh, Quaker colonist of Pennsylvania, returns to Wales for a two-year stay.

Arts and literature

New books
William Jones - Synopsis Palmariorum Matheseos

Births
date unknown
Frederick Cornewall, MP for Montgomery Boroughs 1771-1774 (died 1788)
William Hopkins, clergyman and author (died 1786)
Anna Williams, poet (died 1783)

Deaths
10 February - William Beaw, Bishop of Llandaff, 90
7 October - Richard Lewis of Van
7 November - Daniel Price, Dean of St Asaph (date of birth unknown)
17 November - Sir Edward Mansel, 4th Baronet, 69/70

See also
1706 in Scotland

References

1700s in Wales
Years of the 18th century in Wales